Walking with a Ghost may refer to:

"Walking with a Ghost", a song by Tegan and Sara from their 2004 album So Jealous
Walking with a Ghost, a 2005 EP by the White Stripes featuring a cover version of this song